Kwinana Cogeneration Plant was a cogeneration facility located  south of Perth, Western Australia that operated from 1994 to 2022. It provided steam and electrical power to the BP Australia Kwinana Oil Refinery and electricity to Synergy, the State owned generator/retailer.

As a cogeneration plant, Kwinana supplied both steam and electrical power to its two customers. Steam production from the plant came predominantly from the waste heat from the gas turbine exhausts and was supported by burning refinery fuel gas from the BP Refinery using 'Duct Burners' inside the Heat Recovery Steam Generators (HRSG). The steam produced drove a steam turbine, further enhancing the plant's efficiency, with BP's steam supply coming from the extraction port on the steam turbine after some pressure and temperature had been lost.

Kwinana produced 119MW of electricity, or approximately 6% of Western Australia's requirements. It was primarily fueled by natural gas from Western Australia's North West Shelf gas fields and delivered to the plant by the Dampier to Bunbury Natural Gas Pipeline. The plant was certified for its environmental practices (ISO 14001), quality assurance (ISO 9001) and health and safety (AS4801 & BS18001).

History
Edison Mission Energy commenced construction of the plant in 1994. It was commissioned and entered commercial operation in December 1996.

The final owners of the Kwinana plant were GDF SUEZ and Mitsui & Co., Ltd and RATCH-Australia. The partnership traded as the Perth Power Partnership, with GDF SUEZ Australian Energy and Mitsui & Co., Ltd owning 70 per cent and RATCH-Australia owning 30 per cent.

The plant ceased operation in 2021 and was deregistered from the Western Australian electricity market in March 2022

References

Energy infrastructure completed in 1996
Cogeneration power stations in Australia
Natural gas-fired power stations in Western Australia
Kwinana Beach, Western Australia